Caity Mattinson (born 17 May 1996) is a Scottish rugby union player who plays as a scrum half. After initially playing England she went on to represent Scotland at the Rugby World Cup and Commonwealth Games.

Career

England International
Mattinson was born in Inverness, Scotland but was brought up in Northumberland in England due to her parents moved house when she was 3 years old. After developing through the rugby system in England she made her international debut for England in 2017.
She plays her club rugby for Worcester Warriors.

Scotland International
Following a change in the international regulations Mattinson was able to make her debut for Scotland in February 2022. Mattinson was selected to play for Scotland at the 2022 Commonwealth Games in rugby sevens. She was also selected for the COVID-delayed 2021 Rugby World Cup held in October 2022. In December 2022 she was awarded a professional contract by Scottish Rugby.

References

1996 births
Living people
Female rugby union players
England women's international rugby union players
Scotland women's international rugby union players
Scottish female rugby union players
Rugby sevens players at the 2022 Commonwealth Games